James Richard Fisher (born December 10, 1943) is a scientist at the National Radio Astronomy Observatory at Charlottesville, Virginia.  He received his Ph.D. in Astronomy in 1972 from the University of Maryland, College Park and his B.S. in Physics in 1965 from the Pennsylvania State University, University Park.

Early Childhood
Rick was born in Pittsburgh, Pennsylvania and, at the age of 4, moved with his family to a small farm near Reynoldsville, PA where he attended Sandy Valley Elementary School, West Side Elementary School, and Reynoldsville High School where he graduated in 1961.  As a boy he was interested in amateur radio and astronomy which he combined into a career in radio astronomy.

Education and Research
His PhD thesis was supervised by William C. Erickson and concerned the design and prototyping for an array at the Clark Lake Radio Observatory.  Much of Fisher's career has involved radio astronomy instrumentation, including telescope feed design, radio frequency interference mitigation, and signal processing.  He joined NRAO in 1972 at the Green Bank, West Virginia site.  He was part of the team that conceived and designed the 100-meter Green Bank Telescope there.  He moved to the Central Development Lab at the Charlottesville NRAO headquarters in 2005, where he retired in 2012 but continues to be active in instrumentation projects.

In 1978 through 1980 he spent 18 months at the Radiophysics Laboratory of CSIRO in Sydney, Australia, and on the return trip spent 2 months at the Raman Research Institute in Bangalore, India.

Along with R. Brent Tully, he proposed the Tully–Fisher relation, a correlation between the luminosity of a galaxy and the width of emission lines in its spectrum.

References

External links
 J. Richard Fisher's Homepage 
 J. Richard Fisher's profile at the University of Virginia

Living people
American astronomers
University of Maryland, College Park alumni
1943 births